Marcus Garvey Village, also known as Marcus Garvey Apartments, is a 625-unit affordable housing development located in the Brownsville neighborhood of Brooklyn. The complex was developed by the New York State Urban Development Corporation and designed by British architect Kenneth Frampton (then at the Institute for Architecture and Urban Studies) in 1973 and completed in 1976. The master plan and buildings were later redesigned by Michael Kirchmann of GDSNY for a substantial renovation in 2016. It consists of multiple four-story townhouse-like structures spread across nine city blocks with stoops, private backyards, and semi-public courtyards. 

It was one of the first low-rise, high-density public housing projects and was included in a 1973 Museum of Modern Art exhibition titled Another Chance for Housing: Lowrise Alternatives. The complex was named after Jamaican politician and activist Marcus Garvey.

See also
 Cooperative Village
 Co-op City, Bronx
 Mitchell-Lama Housing Program
 Parkchester, Bronx
 Penn South
 Riverton Houses
 Rochdale Village, Queens
 Southbridge Towers
 Starrett City, Brooklyn
 Stuyvesant Town–Peter Cooper Village

References

External links 

Residential buildings in Brooklyn
Residential buildings completed in 1976